Henequeneros won the first of two straight Cuban National Series titles in 1990, defeating Santiago de Cuba, four games to two. Industriales took third place after defeating Granma. For the first time a playoff final between two teams were played. The playoff series' consisted of round-robin-games the previous years.

Standings

Western zone

Eastern zone

Playoffs
 Championship: Henequeneros def. Santiago de Cuba, 4-2
 Third place: Industriales def. Granma, 3-0

References

 (Note - text is printed in a white font on a white background, depending on browser used.)

Cuban National Series seasons
Cuban National Series
Base
Base